The zipper system, also known as "vertical parity" or the "zebra system", is a type of gender quota for party lists in proportional representation electoral systems. It requires that parties alternate between women and men on their candidate lists, meaning that 50% of the candidates are women and 50% are men. The zipper method is applied to election laws in many countries in order to achieve equal gender representation in candidates and, potentially, elected members.

Process
The zipper system requires parties to create a candidate list in which the gender of the candidates alternates between women and men so that when seats are allocated, the gender of the elected members alternates for each additional seat a party wins. This can result in a near 50–50 split between the number of women and men elected for that party.

Vertical parity can also be combined with horizontal parity, which works in tandem towards the same goal. Horizontal parity requires that each party also fields an equal number of candidate lists with female and male candidates at the top of the list across each constituency that the party contests.

Usage
Some countries mandate the zipper system in their electoral laws. Bolivia, Costa Rica, Ecuador, France, Kenya, Lesotho, Libya, Nicaragua, Senegal, South Korea, Tunisia, and Zimbabwe all implement the zipper system through election law in at least one elected body. Of these countries, many do not use the zipper system evenly across legislative bodies, or have additional requirements. In France, only the electoral bodies that use proportional allocation of seats use the zipper system. Similarly, in Zimbabwe, the zipper system is only used in the Senate elections, and only requires that 60 out of the 80 seats in the Senate apply the zipper system. In addition to vertical parity, Costa Rica uses horizontal parity system, forcing parties to alternate between women and men at the top of their lists in different provinces. Finally, while Mauritania does not use a country-wide vertical parity gender quota rule, they do require that constituencies that require three or more names on the party list to use the zipper system. Zipper systems were also introduced in Italy in 1993, but these laws were overturned by the constitutional court in 1995.

In countries without a legal requirement, some parties choose to implement the zipper system on their own lists, such as the Swedish Social Democratic Party (SAP). The SAP's introduction of the zipper system in 1993 led to 48% of its candidates in the 1994 general elections being women, and contributed to a record number of female MPs being elected to the Riksdag. Elsewhere, until 2007, local left-wing parties in some provinces of Spain, including Andalusia, Castile-La Mancha, and the Balearic Islands, voluntarily implemented zipped candidate lists after the Popular Party obstructed implementing a zipped system in local election laws for the regions. With the passage of the Equality Law under the Spanish Socialist Worker's Party, local zipper laws took effect in 2007.

Analysis
Research has shown that the zipper system to a gender quota ensures near-parity of women and men in legislative bodies. Some research has shown that, in fact, having a gender quota with no rank order rule may be purely symbolic. This is because, in the absence of a zipped list rule, women may not be present in winnable positions of the party list (i.e. women are disproportionally placed at the bottom rather than towards the top of the party list) and are thus not elected, despite a gender quota requirement.

However, although the zipper system rank-order rule requires a 50–50 split between women and men on party lists, it does not always translate to equality of representation in legislatures. Parties, while required to alternate between men and women, often put a man in the first position on the list. If parties win odd numbers of seats in a given election and if the party list begins with a man, the number of men elected will be equal to the number of women elected plus one. This gender imbalance is unavoidable where there are odd numbers of seats, but if the candidate at the top is consistently of one gender, this will advantage that gender (in this case, men). Since this is a common occurrence across many different constituencies and electoral districts, the gender breakdown of the final electoral body can often still be skewed towards men by small to significant margins. Some studies have also shown that the assumption that women are placed at the bottom of party lists consistently is not entirely correct, making placement mandates like the zipper system a moot point. This, however, is in contrast to many other studies finding the opposite.

References

Party-list proportional representation
Gender equality